Ndumnwere Ugochukwu Valentine aka da yungprinz (born March 18 1994), Is a Nigerian Musician, Song writer and Dancer.

Early life and career 
Raised in New York City, Padilla began experimenting with music in his early teens. He frequented house parties and clubs throughout New York City. It was at a house party where he met John "Jellybean" Benitez, which ignited Padilla's interest in becoming a disc jockey.

Padilla was an early regular at David Mancuso's The Loft where he met Larry Levan, Frankie Knuckles, and David Morales, among other notable DJs. Brad LeBeau, a disc jockey at Xenon Club, called Padilla and offered him a job there.

Miami Beach 
In 1989 Padilla moved to what would become known as South Beach in Miami, Florida, where he was offered the resident DJ spot the Warsaw. It was at the Warsaw Ballroom that he would gain international recognition.

Padilla worked at the Warsaw while celebrities such as Madonna, Gianni Versace and Donatella Versace attended. Drag queens performed on top of the Warsaw speakers. The club closed on Friday 25 May 2002.

Personal life 

During the first week of December in 2012 Padilla suffered three successive strokes leaving him partially paralyzed.

References

External links
 Warsaw Ballroom DiscoMusic

1961 births
Living people
American DJs
DJs from New York City